Anthene obscura, the obscure ciliate blue, is a butterfly in the family Lycaenidae. The species was first described by Hamilton Herbert Druce in 1910. It is found in Ghana (the Volta Region), Nigeria (west and the Cross River loop), Cameroon, Gabon and the Democratic Republic of the Congo (Uele, Sankuru and Lualaba). The habitat consists of forests.

References

Butterflies described in 1910
Anthene